Seth Paintsil (born 20 May 1996) is a Ghanaian professional footballer who plays for Austrian Football Bundesliga club TSV Hartberg.

Club career
On 17 August 2020, he joined SV Ried.

On 21 July 2021, he signed a two-year contract with TSV Hartberg.

References

1996 births
Living people
Ghanaian footballers
Ghanaian expatriate footballers
Association football wingers
Red Bull Ghana players
FF Jaro players
Jakobstads BK players
FC Admira Wacker Mödling players
SV Ried players
TSV Hartberg players
Veikkausliiga players
Ykkönen players
Kakkonen players
Austrian Football Bundesliga players
Ghanaian expatriate sportspeople in Finland
Ghanaian expatriate sportspeople in Austria
Expatriate footballers in Finland
Expatriate footballers in Austria
BA Stars F.C. players